SMK Convent Ipoh (Malay: Sekolah Menengah Kebangsaan Convent Ipoh) is an all-girls secondary school located on Jalan Sultan Idris Shah (formerly Brewster Road), Ipoh, Perak, Malaysia. Established in 1907, it is one of the oldest schools in Ipoh and is widely known as Main Convent Ipoh. It is one of the 30 Convent secondary schools in Malaysia.

Principals
 Sister St. Prudence (1907)
 Mother St. Marcellin (1922)
 Sister St. Helen (1939)
 Reverend Mother St. Pauline Legrix (1945 - Mar 1951)
 Reverend Mother St. Paul (1951–1957)
 Reverend Mother St. Pauline Legrix (1957–1966)
 Sister Fidelma Hogan (1966–1972)
 Sister Maureen Chew, PJK (1973–1991)
 Khoo Gim Keat (1992–1994)
 Mrs Valerie Ho (1994–1999)
 Mrs Shireen Ho (1999–2003)
 Ong Yok Kheng (2003–2004)
 Foo Ai Kia (2005–2006)
 Loh Wei Seng (2006-2010)
 Lim Swee Kew (2010-2011)
 Datin Mungit Kaur (2011–2012)
 Nalini Achuthan Nair (2012–2015)
 Toh Suat Goh (2015 - 2019)
Foo Mei Mei (2019 - Present)

Notable alumni
 Bavathaarini Maran
 Michelle Yeoh
 Amy Mastura
 Francissca Peter
 HRH Raja Permaisuri of Perak, Tuanku Zara Salim
 Sara Amelia Bernard
 Preeta Samarasan
 Puteh Naziadin
Lovy Beh Yen Shan
Wong Ai Ling

External links

 
 Convent Girls Alumni

Educational institutions established in 1907
Girls' schools in Malaysia
Secondary schools in Malaysia
Buildings and structures in Ipoh
Convent of the Holy Infant Jesus schools
1907 establishments in British Malaya